Hannibal S. Dixon (July 1, 1834 – April 29, 1881) was a member of the Wisconsin State Assembly.

Biography
Dixon was born in Jefferson County, New York in 1834. Reports have differed on the exact date and location. He relocated to Wisconsin in 1855. He married Alice Dickinson and they had four children. Dixon died in New London, Wisconsin in 1881.

Career
Dixon was a Republican member of the Assembly during the 1877 session. Additionally, he was president (similar to mayor) of New London and a member of the county board of Waupaca County, Wisconsin.

References

External links
 
Ancestry.com

People from Jefferson County, New York
People from New London, Wisconsin
Republican Party members of the Wisconsin State Assembly
Mayors of places in Wisconsin
County supervisors in Wisconsin
1834 births
1881 deaths
19th-century American politicians